Pitcairnia arcuata is a flowering plant in the Bromeliaceae family. It is native to Costa Rica, Panama, Colombia, Peru, and Ecuador.

References

arcuata
Flora of Central America
Flora of South America
Plants described in 1886
Taxa named by Édouard André